EPRB may refer to:

 A version of the EPR paradox, formulated by David Bohm, sometimes called the EPRB paradox
 Emergency Position-Indicating Radio Beacon, most commonly abbreviated EPIRB